Élton Lexandro de Oliveira Santos or simply Élton (born August 25, 1985 in Curitiba) is a Brazilian former footballer who played as an attacking midfielder. He played in the Romanian Liga I for Gaz Metan Mediaș.

External links

CBF
globoesporte

1985 births
Living people
Brazilian footballers
Guarani FC players
Paraná Clube players
CS Gaz Metan Mediaș players
Liga I players
Brazilian expatriate footballers
Expatriate footballers in Romania
Association football midfielders
Footballers from Curitiba